Joseph E. Gurzenda (March 24, 1937 – September 22, 2014) was a member of the Pennsylvania State Senate, serving from 1977 to 1980.

He was born in Tresckow, Carbon County, son of Joseph and Margaret (Bodnar) Gurzenda. He attended the University of Delaware and King's College.

He won his seat in 1976 in an upset over Republican incumbent Fred Hobbs, becoming only the second Democratic Party member to win this seat since 1900.

After his electoral defeat in 1980, he became a business entrepreneur, owning and operating several small retail businesses.  He also worked in strip mine development.  He was later appointed by then Governor Edward G. Rendell in 2004, to the State Tax Equalization Board.

He was married to Monica Mulik. He died in McAdoo, Pennsylvania in 2014.

References

Democratic Party Pennsylvania state senators
1937 births
2014 deaths